Irismar Cardozo (born 2 April 1998) is a Venezuelan boxer. She competed in the women's flyweight event at the 2020 Summer Olympics.

References

External links
 

1998 births
Living people
Venezuelan women boxers
Olympic boxers of Venezuela
Boxers at the 2020 Summer Olympics
Place of birth missing (living people)
Pan American Games medalists in boxing
Pan American Games bronze medalists for Venezuela
Boxers at the 2019 Pan American Games
Medalists at the 2019 Pan American Games
21st-century Venezuelan women